12-String Blues (sub-titled Live at the Scholar), is the first album by American guitarist Leo Kottke, released in 1969.

History
The majority of the album was recorded live at The Scholar, a Minneapolis coffee house (formerly known as the Ten O'Clock Scholar in another location) that had also featured Bob Dylan, Spider John Koerner and Simon & Garfunkel early in their careers. Three of the instrumentals were recorded in a studio. The LP record was a limited edition of 1000 copies, on the Minneapolis West Bank-based Oblivion Records, and has not been reprinted and/or re-issued on CD. Publishing for the songs was by Symposium Music, same as the publishing and record label for Kottke's third LP.

Most of the songs on the album were re-recorded for Kottke's album Circle Round The Sun.

Track listing (with Kottke's notes)

Personnel
Leo Kottke – 6 & 12-string guitars, vocals
Annie Elliott – cover design

Copyright Symposium Music, BMI 1969

External links
 Read some contemporary and retrospective views: Out of Oblivion
 Leo Kottke's official site

Leo Kottke live albums
1969 debut albums
1969 live albums
Live blues albums